A Tale of Thousand Stars ( – 1000stars;  – 1000stars) is a 2021 Thai television series starring Pirapat Watthanasetsiri (Earth) and Sahaphap Wongratch (Mix). The series follows Tian Sopasitsakun (Sahaphap Wongratch), who receives a heart transplant after volunteer teacher Torfun (Sarunchana Apisamaimongkol) dies in a tragic accident. By reading through Torfun's diary, Tian learns about her final wish, which is to count a thousand stars with Phupha Viriyanon (Pirapat Watthanasetsiri), a chief forest ranger. In time, Tian accepts Torfun's destiny as his own.

Directed by Noppharnach Chaiwimol and produced by GMMTV, it is one of the twelve television series GMMTV showcased for 2020 during their "New & Next" event on 15 October 2019. Originally scheduled as a 2020 release, the series premiered on GMM 25 and LINE TV on 29 January 2021, airing on Fridays at 20:30 ICT and 22:30 ICT, respectively. The series aired its final episode on 2 April 2021, it was replaced by Fish upon the Sky (wherein Sahaphap is a part of the cast.) on its timeslot on GMM25. The series had an rerun every Friday to Sunday from 3 September to 24 September 2021 at 8:30 pm on GMM25, replacing the reruns of The Series and Still 2gether. The series was replaced by the rerun of its successor series, Fish upon the Sky on its timeslot.

It was featured on Teen Vogue's best BL dramas of 2021 list.

Production
The production team at the beginning chose one of the hill-tribe villages in the northern part of Thailand to shoot the series, but later on, due to tradition and belief, the initially chosen locations were all removed from the plan because they were not allowed to shoot. As the local people were afraid that, with the numbers of shooting crew members and production could be against the local condition. The village, they first picked, has a tradition of spirit worship. The villagers were afraid that the shooting could disturb the spirit in the place. The production team then decided to build the entire village from scratch in different locations (Mainly in Chiang Rai), while the novel and series portraited the story in somewhere in Chiang Mai. The production team had to build Tian's House, Pha Pan Dao School, Khama's House, and villagers' houses from. The "Pra Pi Run" Unit, which was a workplace, commanding station and accommodation for Phupha and was renovated from an old and deserted wayside shelter.

Synopsis 
After volunteer teacher, Torfun dies in a tragic accident, her heart is transplanted to Tian (Sahaphap Wongratch). Through a series of diary entries, Tian learns about Torfun's life, secrets, interests, as well as her promise to count a thousand stars with Chief forest officer Phupha (Pirapat Watthanasetsiri). Tian, as the new volunteer teacher, attempts to befriend Phupha, but the latter is initially cold to him. As the two slowly grow closer, Tian's heart beats fast around the military officer, and he starts to fall for him, much like his heart's previous owner did. Treading on dangerous territory, can the two keep their thousand star promise?

Cast and characters 
Below are the cast of the series:

Main 
 Pirapat Watthanasetsiri (Earth) as Phupha Viriyanon (The Chief Forest Officer)
 Sahaphap Wongratch (Mix) as Tian Sopasitsakun (The Volunteer Teacher)

Supporting 
  (Aye) as Torfun Chareonpon
 Nawat Phumphotingam (White) as Tul (Tian's Friend)
 Krittanai Arsalprakit (Nammon) as Nam (The Doctor)
  (Khaotung) as Longtae (Khama's Son)
 Nattharat Kornkaew (Champ) as Yod (The Technician)
  (Drake) as Rang (The Ranger)
Kamonlapat Dokmonta (Aum) as Ayi
Woraphanmai Egami (Kinuko) as Meejoo
Achirapol Jinapanyo (Achi) as Khaonueng
Marinda Halpin as Inta
Gimjeng Yanathip (Gim) as Kalae

Guest 
 Jakkrit Ammarat (Ton) as Teerayut (Tian's Father)
 Paweena Charivsakul (Jeab) as Lalita (Tian's Mother)
 Witaya Jethapai (Thanom) as Bianglae Khama (The Village Chief)
 Thanongsak Suphakan (Nong) as Sakda
 Phatchara Tubthong (Kapook) as Jeab (Nam's Wife)

Episodes

Music

International broadcast 
Philippines – The series was among the five GMMTV television series acquired by ABS-CBN Corporation, as announced by Dreamscape Entertainment on 10 September 2020. All episodes were made available for streaming via iWantTFC on 29 January 2021, simulcast with its Thailand broadcast.
Taiwan – LINE TV Taiwan streams every Friday evening at 21:30 starting from 29 January 2021.

Awards and nominations

References

External links 
 GMMTV

Television series by GMMTV
Thai romantic drama television series
2020 Thai television series debuts
GMM 25 original programming
Thai boys' love television series
2020s LGBT-related drama television series